Psote (died 300), also known as Bisada, Besada, Abashadi, Abassadius, or Beshada, was a bishop of Ebsay in Upper Egypt. He was martyred by beheading at Antinoe.

His feast day is observed on December 23 in the Coptic Church or on December 21 in some other churches.

References
 Holweck, F. G. A Biographical Dictionary of the Saints. St. Louis, MO: B. Herder Book Co. 1924.

3rd-century Christian martyrs
Saints from Roman Egypt
Egyptian hermits
Egyptian bishops
300 deaths
Year of birth unknown